P. Sreeramakrishnan, is an Indian politician born on 14 November 1967 in Perinthalmanna (a town in Malappuram district, Kerala). He became a member of the Thirteenth Kerala Legislative Assembly on 1 June 2011. He also served as the Speaker of Kerala Legislative Assembly from 2016 to 2021.

As Speaker of the Kerala Legislative Assembly, Shri P. Sreeramakrishnan adopted progressive methods to ensure public participation and boost the peoples' involvement in the legislative process, convened the Festival on Democracy and orchestrated the Ponnani Model of flood relief and rehabilitation, which has been recognised by the UN Forum for its massive public participation and optimum use of technology to tackle the calamity. He also envisioned and launched the Loka Kerala Sabha, a platform for Global Keralites to participate in matters of the state.

His literary publications Atmiyata Kalapamakumbol, Janadhipathyam Samskaram Samakaleena Lokam and Navothanam Nava janadhipathyam Nava Keralam support his vision of a new democratic Kerala that strays from the traditional, dogmatic ideals followed by contemporary Kerala. He is a recipient of the Pravasi Bharathi Award and the 2017 Bharat Jyothi Award for the Best Speaker. He was also presented with The Ideal Legislative Assembly Speaker/Ideal Legislative Council Chairman Award on 20 February 2020 at the 10th edition of Bharatiya Chhatra Sansad in New Delhi, conferred by the Vice President, Shri M. Venkaiah Naidu.

Shri P Sreeramakrishnan is an avid traveller. His dedication to world youth movements warranted his travel around the world to countries like Nepal, Sri Lanka, Laos, China, North Korea, Russia, Cuba, Venezuela, South Africa, U.K. and Kenya.

Positions Held 

 Secretary of Deshabhimani Balasangam of Keezhatoor Panchayat
Office Bearer of the N.S.S College Union, Ottapalam
Chairman of the Calicut University Union, Calicut
Senate Member and Syndicate Member of Calicut University, Calicut
District President of the Students' Federation of India (SFI), Palakkad Committee
Block Secretary of the Democratic Youth Federation of India (DYFI), Perinthalmanna
District Secretary of the Democratic Youth Federation of India (DYFI), Malappuram
State Joint Secretary of the Democratic Youth Federation of India (DYFI)
State President of the Democratic Youth Federation of India (DYFI)
Asia Pacific Coordinator of the World Federation of Democratic Youth (WFDY)
Managing Editor of Yuvadhara magazine
State Secretary of the Democratic Youth Federation of India (DYFI)
All India President of the Democratic Youth Federation of India (DYFI)
Vice Chairman of the Youth Welfare Board
Leader of the World Federation of Democratic Youth (WFDY) [Asia Pacific region]
Member of the Thirteenth Kerala Legislative Assembly, Ponnani constituency
Speaker of the Fourteenth Kerala Legislative Assembly

Early life and education
Shri P Sreeramakrishnan was born on 14 November 1967 to parents Shri. P Govindan Nair and Smt. P Seetha Lakshmi in Perinthalmanna, in the Malappuram district of Kerala. He has two siblings, both currently situated in the United Arab Emirates. He completed his lower primary education from Pattikad GLP school and went on to complete his secondary education from Perinthalmanna G.H.S.S. and Pattikkad G.H.S.S.

In 1983, he enrolled at NSS College, Ottapalam, where he completed his pre degree and bachelor's degree in Bachelor of Arts. During his years of college education, Shri P Sreeramakrishnan expressed an avid interest in essay writing, elocution and drama and excelled in curricular as well as co-curricular activities. An active participant in university youth festivals, he won the prize for the best essay in South India in the Inter University Youth Festival in 1988. Having obtained a BEd degree, Shri P Sreeramakrishnan served as a teacher in the Melattur Ravivarma Mooppil Eradi Higher Secondary School before entering into active politics.

Personal life 
On 18 August 1996 Shri P Sreeramakrishnan married Smt. M Divya, with whom he has a daughter, Niranjana and a son named Priyaranjan.

Political career 
For a child who had started taking interest in politics at the age of ten, some of the famous literary works brought out at the time by D.C Publications such as the volumes of 'Bharatha Vijnana Kosham' (translated, The Encyclopedia of India) presented by his father, opened up his path to the world of letters. As Secretary of the High School unit of the Students' Federation, his political activism began at age twelve. In the socio-political saga spanning three and a half decades that followed, the metamorphic evolution from Chairman of the Calicut University Union to District President of the SFI Palakkad Committee is what drove his path to becoming a dynamic youth leader in DYFI and, further on, to the Kerala Legislative Assembly.

1980-1991: Early Political Career 
Shri P Sreeramakrishnan's political career began during his student life in Perinthalmanna G.H.S.S, when he became the Secretary of Deshabhimani Balasangam of Keezhattoor Panchayat in 1980. While a student in the N.S.S. College, Ottapalam, Shri P. Sreeramakrishnan held the position of Office bearer of the college union. He was also named Chairman of the Calicut University Union. His active involvement as Senate Member and Syndicate Member of Calicut University while a student of the N.S.S Training College, Ottapalam granted him the ability to unify academic excellence and union activism. Being an active worker of SFI and DYFI, he served as the District President of the SFI Palakkad Committee from 1988 to 1991.

1991-2011: Leadership in the Democratic Youth Federation of India (DYFI) 
Shri P. Sreeramakrishnan has held various positions in DYFI from the root level to the level of national leadership. He served as Block Secretary, Perinthalmanna from 1991 and district secretary, Malappuram from 1997. After working at the Block and District Committees of the Democratic Youth Federation of India for a decade, Sreeramakrishnan became its State joint secretary and then the State President in 2005, thereby making him the Asia Pacific Co-ordinator of the World Federation of Democratic Youth.

He served as the Managing Editor of 'Yuvadhara' magazine and played a prominent role in making it more acceptable to the public. After progressing to become State secretary, Shri P. Sreeramakrishnan was elected as the All India President of DYFI in 2007 in the national meeting held at Chennai and continued in the post till 2012. During his time of leadership at DYFI, Shri P Sreeramakrishnan initiated a movement to address unemployment and under-employment issues faced by the youth of Kerala, as well employment issues faced by IT professionals in Bangalore. He was instrumental in the pro-CPI (M) Democratic Youth Front of India (DYFI) call for taking an uncompromising stand against the imperialistic forces in fighting for the unemployment issue among the youth, and asked the government to formulate creative programmes to mitigate the crisis.

He was Vice-Chairman of the Youth Welfare Board from 2006 to 2011 during which he initiated various notable projects. He was also a member of the Government Committee that prepared the draft law for the constitution of the Youth Commission. The State Youth Welfare Board advanced through a different effective path under his leadership. During that period, he was also the leader of the World Federation of Democratic Youth(WFDY) in the Asia-Pacific region. He organised World Youth Conferences and Forums against imperialism. As part of World Youth movements, he visited Nepal, Sri Lanka, Laos, China, North Korea, Russia, Cuba, Venezuela, South Africa, U.K. and Kenya and also attended Youth Conferences in various foreign countries.

2011-2020: Kerala Legislative Assembly 
The youth leader entered electoral politics when he first contested the elections to the Kerala Legislative Assembly in 2006 from Nilambur constituency. Later in 2011, he contested from the Ponnani constituency, winning the constituency by a majority of 4,101 votes, he became a member of the Thirteenth Kerala Legislative Assembly. He continued to win the elections once again in 2016, doubling up on the majority of votes to 15,640 votes from the Ponnani constituency. It was in the formation of the Fourteenth Kerala Legislative Assembly, that Shri P Sreeramakrishnan was elected as Speaker of the assembly on 3 June 2016.

As Speakers of the Kerala Legislative Assembly are elected by the members of the Assembly itself, Shri P Sreeramakrishnan polled 92 votes against 46 votes of that of his opponent, Shri V.P Sajeendran of the opposition Congress led United Democratic Front (UDF), making him the 21st and current Speaker of the Kerala Legislative Assembly. It was noted that the BJP's lone member in the Kerala Legislative Assembly, Shri O Rajagopal also voted in favour of Shri P Sreeramakrishnan. Justifying his decision to favour the LDF candidate, the BJP leader said one of the reasons was that UDF had openly stated that they did not want the BJP MLA's vote. Rajagopal revealed that "It's my personal vote for Sreeramakrishnan who is a good public worker and also a friend of mine."

Books Authored 
Expressing an ardent interest in literary activities from a very young age, Shri P Sreeramakrishnan has authored two books, as discussed below,  in addition to seventeen books he compiled and published regarding rules that determine the practice and procedure of the Kerala Legislative Assembly.

Janadhipathyam Samskaram Samakaleena Lokam comprises a number of articles that analyses the image of a contemporary Kerala through the eyes of secularism and a sense of reality.

Navodhanam Navi Janadhipathya NavaKeralam is a book that explores Kerala post the floods that devastated the state in 2018 and the swift action taken by the government to build the land up once again to its former glory and also touches a number of various other topics such as how the new democratic has changed the face of Kerala, NRI and adivasi welfare, discrimination suffered by lower castes in contemporary Kerala and the new outlook and perspective observed by the citizens today. The book was released in Sharjah by a ruling family member Sheikh Abdullah Bin Mohammed Al Qasimi at Sharjah.

Achievements as Speaker 
As the Speaker of the Fourteenth Kerala Legislative, Shri P SreeRamakrishnan took resolute and unrelenting efforts in breaking out of the conventional role accorded to and expected of the position. Several of his reforms include rendering the Legislative Assembly premises a model in bio diverse ecosystems, declaration of green protocol, setting up a plantain grove with a collection of more than 30 endemic varieties, a bio-waste treatment plant, and other endeavours that were undertaken and accomplished as Speaker of the Assembly.

Introduced new and novel ways of involving citizens in making amendments to bills 

 Shri P Sreeramakrishnan adopted progressive methods to ensure peoples' participation in legislative processes by enabling the public to directly contact the Speaker's office for any amendments, changes or additions they would like to voice on a drafted bill. The Speaker's office would then get in touch with the concerned minister to see if the amendment can be implemented. This initiative to build a transparent democracy that promotes the electorate's involvement in framing the laws that govern the society turned out to be a success as a bill adopted in 2019 on clinical establishments attracted almost 450 suggested amendments to the Speaker's office out of which around 140 amendments were enacted.

Recognised for "Festival on Democracy", a first-of-its kind, recurring event that includes the youth 

 As part of the Diamond Jubilee celebrations of the first Kerala Legislative Assembly (1957 – 2017), the 'Festival on Democracy', a thematic concept that envisaged multiple national level conferences aimed at strengthening and fostering the power and scope of democracy and to inculcate in the youth a love for democratic values and the democratic way of life was conceived by P Sreeramakrishnan. The concept attracted much favor and fanfare across the country and was inaugurated by Shri. Ram Nath Kovind, Hon’ble President of India on 6 Aug 2018.

Credited with the digitalization of the Kerala Legislative Assembly and moving it closer to becoming a totally paperless establishment 

 The development of the software "E-Niyamasabha" which was the first phase in the digitalization of the Kerala Legislative Assembly project to make the assembly paper-free was completed in January 2020, marking the assembly's move to the digital age. Shri P Sreeramakrishnan first spoke of the move to digitalization in May 2019. Although the first phase was initially to take 14 months to complete, it was implemented 8 months after the announcement. It was his zealous pursuits that has to some extent actualized the attempts at transforming Kerala Legislative Assembly to a totally paperless establishment.

Initiated various critical projects that have significantly impacted the lifestyles and livelihoods of the people 

 A Rs. 74.4 crore fresh water project, initiated by Shri P Sreeramakrishnan, which aims to supply fresh water to Ponnani taluk has been sanctioned and completed at Rs. 60 crore. The water treatment plant, which treats 50 million litres of water per day will aid the Thrikkanapuram Danida project, and  is currently pumping a maximum of 65 lakh litres of water. With the realization of the new project, three and a half times more fresh water will be pumped.

Known for bringing about 'Sabha TV' aimed at showcasing the functioning of the KLA and its activities 

 With an aim to shed light on the history of KLA, the impact of laws passed by it and to initiate debates and discourses in the public arena on various matters being considered by the legislative assembly, a channel named Sabha TV and an O.T.T platform were launched under the guidance of Shri P Sreeramakrishnan. The inauguration celebrating Kerala Sabha TV was conducted by Lok Sabha Speaker Om Birla in Thiruvananthapuram via videoconferencing  on 17 August 2020. The Chief Minister, Shri Pinrayi Vijayan also joined the programme via videoconferencing. The OTT platform, Sabha TV is the first of its kind by a Legislative Assembly in India.

Demonstrated commitment to minority sections by formulating special committees for their welfare 

 Shri P Sreeramakrishnan, as Speaker of the Kerala Legislative Assembly, nominated and pushed for the establishment of a separate Committee for the Welfare of Members of Transgender Community in the Assembly.

Gained international praise for an innovative model of flood relief work that leveraged technology and the involvement of the public 

 The Ponnani Legislative Assembly, led by Shri P Sreeramakrishnan envisaged a special mechanism to calculate the intensity of damages caused by the Kerala Floods in 2018 that claimed the lives of over 400 people and caused damage and destruction to property and infrastructure worth crores. The Ponnani model of flood relief work, carried out with massive public participation and by unleashing the optimum potential of technology gained international acclaim and was listed as a topic of discussion at a key United Nations Forum.

Envisioned and launched the Loka Kerala Sabha, a one of a kind platform for Global Keralites to participate in matters of the state 

 It was under the guidance of Shri P Sreeramakrishnan that Loka Kerala Sabha was formulated and conducted. Loka Kerala Sabha is an event conceived and hosted in co-operation with the Government of Kerala, to bring all Keralites living in various parts of the world under one platform with a representative nature, to invoke their collective conscience and harness and share their achievements and progress to the benefit and welfare of the State. The event, which is proposed to happen once every two years, celebrated the second Loka Kerala Sabha on 2 and 3 January 2020, with Mr. Arif Mohammad Khan, the governor of Kerala inaugurating the event in Thiruvananthapuram.

Supervised the launch of the Assembly’s official newsletter 

 It was under the leadership of Shri P Sreeramakrishnan that 'Arivoram', a bimonthly official newsletter of the Kerala Legislative Assembly was launched.

Introduced a system to analyze the impact of laws passed in Kerala over time 

 Shri P Sreeramakrishnan also instituted a legal impact assessment system, a mechanism to initiate a study on the impact of laws passed by the Kerala Legislative Assembly in the last 60 years. The study was the first of its kind in the history of Indian Legislature.

Participated actively in various landmark civil projects in his constituency of Ponnani 

 Shri P Sreeramakrishnan was instrumental in bringing the proposed plan for a bridge connecting Ponnani harbour with Padinharekara to fulfilment. The infrastructure development in Ponnani, with a budget allocation of Rs. 289 crore via KIIFB is for a proposed suspension bridge which will come up across the Bharathapuzha connecting Ponnani harbour with Padinharekara. The government began the tendering process for the project in October 2020. Modelled on the lines of the iconic Howrah bridge in Kolkata, the one km long bridge is set to pass over the estuary where the Bharathapuzha opens out into the Arabian sea.

Initiatives Undertaken

Festival on Democracy 
"Festival on Democracy" is a thematic concept envisaged by P. Sreeramakrishnan includes multiple national level conferences  aimed at strengthening and fostering the power, value and scope of democracy among the youth of the state. Its purpose is to inculcate in the youth a love for democratic values and the democratic way of life. The concept attracted much favor and fanfare across the country and was inaugurated by Shri. Ram Nath Kovind, Hon’ble President of India on 6 Aug 2018. The Festival on Democracy consists of a string of academic and cultural programs held across the state of Kerala to celebrate the occasion of the Diamond Jubilee of the Kerala Legislative Assembly. It includes seminars, exhibitions, debates, model assembly, and allows certain selection sections to visit the Assembly in Thiruvananthapuram. The event technically comprises six major conclaves: National Women Legislators Conference, National Students Parliament, National Media Conclave on Democracy, Special Conference on Assembly Proceedings and Consensus Conclave on Kerala Development.

The first National Conference under "Festival on Democracy", a 'National Legislators' Conference on the Challenges in the Empowerment of Scheduled Castes and Scheduled Tribes in Independent India saw the active participation of elected representatives from several State Legislatures of India, with massive participation from members belonging to SC, ST and backward classes. The second National Conference under "Festival of Democracy", the National Students Parliament (NSP) saw the astounding participation of nearly 3000 youth from all over the country as well as from a few foreign countries. This celebration of youth and democracy had in its wake several plenary and regional sessions apart from the novel 'Rings of Fire', 'Symphony for Harmony', cultural presentations, and "March of Democracy" that involved more than 10,000 college students and a pompous valedictory function. The three-day NSP Kerala – 2019 was attended by several national leaders, cutting across political and cultural lines. Shri P. Sreeramakrishnan had participated as a key dignitary at the preceding 'Bharatiya Chhatra Sansad' i.e. Indian Students Parliament which was Founded by Shri Rahul V. Karad –Vice President- MAEER's MIT, Pune in 2011. Shri. P. Sreeramakrishnan along with Shri. Rahul V. Karad felt the need to host such a 'Students Parliament' at State Level supported by State Governments across India to sensitise the Youth on Democratic Values and encourage them to participate actively in Public and Political life.

Loka Kerala Sabha 
The first Loka Kerala Sabha was formulated and conducted under the guidance of Shri P Sreeramakrishnan in January 2018. The event is hosted in cooperation with the Government of Kerala, to bring all Keralites living in various parts of the world under one platform with a representative nature, to invoke their collective conscience and harness and share their achievements and progress to the benefit and welfare of the State. The event, which is proposed to happen once every two years, celebrated the second Loka Kerala Sabha on 2 and 3 January 2020, with Mr. Arif Mohammad Khan, the governor of Kerala inaugurating the event in Thiruvananthapuram.

The first Loka Kerala Sabha saw the participation of around 500 delegates from 27 countries. It led to the formation of 7 standing committees that suggested proper recommendations to the government. The second Loka Kerala Sabha proved that
the measures taken by the government considering those recommendations have benefitted the expatriates.

The 351-member Loka Kerala Sabha comprises the Members of the Legislative Assembly of Kerala, the Members of the Indian Parliament from Kerala, non-resident Keralites of Indian citizenship nominated by the Government of Kerala, and select members of the returnee community. The non-resident members are selected from abroad and other states/UTs within India, taking into account the diversities of gender, age and occupational status. They also include eminent non-resident Keralites who have contributed immensely in their respective fields of engagement to achieve public acclaim.

Shri P Sreeramakrishnan is of the opinion that the objectives of the LKS went beyond being an investors' meet and Kerala became a model to the world. He also added that this platform enabled non-residential Keralites from across the world to come together and share their unique experiences.

Vasantholsavam 2019 – 2020 (Spring Fest 2019 -2020), organized as part of the second Loka Kerala Sabha (World Kerala Assembly) and endorsed by the Kerala Tourism Department and DTPC of Thiruvananthapuram saw the active participation of government departments like the Forest and Agriculture Departments, agencies and private companies. Flower shows, exhibition cum sale of agricultural products, exhibition of rare herbs and medicinal plants, insight into the tribal traditions, natural treatment camps and tribal food festivals were organized as part of the fest. About 20,000 plants were imported for the exhibition from the garden city of Bangalore.

Ponnani Model on Flood Relief and Rehabilitation 
The Kerala floods in 2018 devastated the state, killing over 400 people and destroyed infrastructure and property worth crores. Districts, municipalities and taluks joined the state government in formation of plans to recover and build Kerala back to its pristine state. The Ponnani model flood relief work, carried out with massive public participation and by unleashing the optimum potential of technology gained international acclaim and was listed as a topic of discussion at a key United Nations Forum. It was also deliberated at the South Asia Together for Humanitarian Imperative (SATHI) held in September 2018.

The Ponnani Legislative Assembly, led by Shri P Sreeramakrishnan envisaged a special mechanism to calculate the intensity of damages caused. A geographic Information System (GIS) Drone Field Survey was carried out in Ponnani from 23 to 30 August 2018 under the guidance of Shri P Sreeramakrishnan. The cost of the drone survey was narrowed to Rs. 5 lakh from Rs. 20 lakh, through the Disaster Support Concept, a support system from collaborating partners - Alhambricks Knowledge Endowment and Ponnani Municipality Chairman CP Mohammed Kunhi. The amount was equally met by Ponnani Municipality and Corporate Social Responsibility Initiative of Uralungal Labour Contract Cooperative Society (ULCCS), based in Kozhikode. Alhambricks Knowledge Endowment carried out the interpretation, data mining, indexing and other socio-scientific enhancement free of cost. The post daum hosting development- interpretation of the data, mobilising resources and devising distribution mechanism was done by Infosys.

It took seven days for the team to identify the affected areas and verify them with the help of technology as well as volunteers on the field. By using drones synchronised with satellite images to ascertain the route of the flood, false claims on loss of property as well as livestock were weeded out. All the relief material distributed were marked with QR codes, to ensure that they were delivered to the right houses and people.

The municipality used the novel method of drone survey to calculate the damage caused by the flood by conducting an aerial survey using the drone. A virtual platform was developed by IT students to collect data and file them for reference. Furthermore, funds were raised through co-operative banks to acquire resources to distribute to those affected.

Ponnani Fresh Water Project 
A mega fresh water supply project, initiated by Shri P Sreeramakrishnan, which aims to supply fresh water to Ponnani taluk has been sanctioned and completed at Rs. 60 crore. With the budget for the project at Rs. 74.4 crore, the project was completed with a balance of Rs. 14.4 crore. The water treatment plant, which treats 50 million litres of water per day will aid the Thrikkanapuram Danida project is currently pumping a maximum of 65 lakh litres of water. With the realization of the new project, three and a half times more fresh water will be pumped. For this, a pipeline has been laid from Nariparambu pump house to Thrikkanapuram. The water reaches the houses after a 6 step purification process. The project is envisioned to take into account the amount of fresh water required for the taluk for the next 30 years.

The current practice of pumping water directly into the river will be completely changed. The river water will be converted into fresh water after stage treatment with the help of modern machinery.  The plan is to completely demolish the fresh water supply system of the Ponnani municipality and install a new one. The Rs 124.8 crore project was given administrative approval in January 2021. Funds for the first and second phases have been raised through KIIFB. As part of the replacement of the pipelines, 210 km of roads will have to be demolished, with Rs. 20 crore being set apart for road construction. The fresh water project was inaugurated by the Chief Minister, Pinarayi Vjiayan on 7 February 2021, in the presence of Speaker P Sreeramakrishnan, Ministers KT Jalil, K Krishnan Kutty and ET Muhammad Basheer MP.

Civil works undertaken as MLA of Ponnani 
Right after being elected into office in 2011, Shri P Sreeramakrishnan secured Rs. 1350 crore funding to be distributed over the next five towards various efforts for the improvement of physical infrastructure and standard of living in Ponnani. Development activities and investments were set aside for education and school infrastructure projects (Rs. 8 crore), tourism development (Rs. 5 crore), construction of coastal borders (Rs. 10 crore), construction and employment of maternity and fetal care hospitals (Rs. 5 crore), development of village and state highway roads (Rs. 300 crore), development of village reforms (Rs. 103 crore), construction of a coastal police station, construction of bridges like the  Kadavanad Pookaithapalam at a cost of Rs. 25 crore.

After taking up office as the MLA representing Ponnani, Malappuram district, Shri P Sreeramakrishnan arranged funding sanctioned by the Kerala Legislative Assembly for improving the traffic infrastructure in Ponnani in January 2016. The Puthuponnani-Kuttippuram road offers wider lanes, zebra crossings and roundabouts to effectively direct traffic. Various healthcare improvement projects were undertaken under the leadership of Shri P Sreeramakrishnan. The Ponnani Taluk Hospital which was under equipped and under developed got a facelift in April 2018, with yearly development funds of Rs. 1.3 crore when Shri P Sreeramakrishnan undertook efforts to convert the hospital into a multi-speciality hospital. Initially established in 1967, it is now Ponnani's pride in the health sector. Along with medical improvements, the hospital is also equipped with a computerized OP counter token system in the newly constructed OP building. A maternal and child hospital was also established specialising in maternity and fetal care with a government decision to allot 85 posts to the speciality hospital. Shri P Sreeramakrishnan was  called to name the first baby delivered at the hospital.

The development for the proposed Ponnani Drinking Water Project, a project which was previously stalled, was implemented with a sanction of Rs. 75 crore with a water treatment plant of Rs. 40 crore and a pipeline project of Rs. 35 crore under the direction of Shri P Sreeramakrishnan. Rs. 85 lakh was sanctioned in February 2020 for the renovation of the historic Ponnani Missouri Church, which was previously marked to be demolished. Subsequently, with the intervention of Shri P Sreeramakrishnan, the controversial move was halted and a decision was made to renovate the building under the Missouri Heritage project.

The Ponnani fishing harbour project was completed with a fund of Rs. 3.79 crore under the initiative taken by Shri P Sreeramakrishnan at the request of the local fishermen who asked for a wharf to be built, making it easier for boats to dock at the harbour. The newly constructed wharf which is 100 metres in length and 7 metres in width has an additional parking area provided.

These and many other initiatives and programmes pursued in Ponnani have reinforced P Sreeramakrishnan's image as a highly proactive and development centric leader.

Awards and Recognition 
The Ideal Legislative Assembly Speaker/Ideal Legislative Council Chairman Award was presented to Shri P Sreeramakrishnan on 20 February 2020 at the 10th edition of Bharatiya Chhatra Sansad in New Delhi, conferred by the Vice President, Shri M. Venkaiah Naidu. He is also a recipient of the Pravasi Bharathi Award and the 2017 Bharat Jyothi Award for the Best Speaker.

Political and Social Views 
From the start of his political career, Shri P Sreeramakrishnan has been a strong vocal advocate for youth rights in the state of Kerala. During his tenure as President of DYFI, he called for an uncompromising stand against the imperialistic forces that had created a host of crises like unemployment and spiralling prices due to the wrong economic policies pursued by the UPA government at the centre in 2007. He is a member of the Communist Party of India (Marxist) and a prominent patron of DYFI.

References

External links
 'DYFI Kerala'

Speakers of the Kerala Legislative Assembly
1967 births
Living people
Malayali politicians
People from Malappuram district
Communist Party of India (Marxist) politicians from Kerala
Kerala MLAs 2011–2016
Kerala MLAs 2016–2021
DYFI All India Presidents